This is a list of singles that have peaked in the top 10 of the French Singles Chart in 2016. 86 singles were in the top 10 this year which 24 were on the number-one spot.

Top 10 singles

Entries by artists
The following table shows artists who achieved two or more top 10 entries in 2016. The figures include both main artists and featured artists and the peak position in brackets.

See also
2016 in French music
List of number-one hits of 2016 (France)

References

External links 
 LesCharts.com

Top
France top 10
Top 10 singles in 2016
France 2016